K35 may refer to:
 K-35 (Kansas highway), former
 Beechcraft K35 Bonanza, an American civil utility aircraft
 Dialog K35, a smartphone
 Die Schuldigkeit des ersten Gebots, a sacred musical play by Wolfgang Amadeus Mozart
 , a corvette of the Swedish Navy
 Mamostong Kangri, a mountain
 Potassium-35, an isotope of potassium